Eugênio, sometimes Eugénio, is a Portuguese masculine given name equivalent to Spanish Eugenio.

People
Eugênio Sales (1920–2012), Brazilian cardinal
Eugênio Izecksohn (1932–2013), Brazilian herpetologist
 Eugénio Fernando Bila, Mozambican football player
 Eugênio German, Brazilian chess master
 Eugénio Neves, Portuguese footballer
 Eugênio Rômulo Togni, Brazilian footballer

References

Portuguese masculine given names